Roman Svitlychnyi (born 4 January 1986) is a Ukrainian football defender who plays for Volyn Lutsk.

Career
Svitlychnyi began playing professional football with FC Metalist Kharkiv's team. He would next spend some years with its club. Last time, 8 July 2010, he signed contract with FC Tytan Armyansk in the Ukrainian First League.

In autumn 2016 he signed contract with Maldivian Club Green Streets, but in February 2017 returned to Ukraine and made a deal with FC Inhulets Petrove.

References

External links

1986 births
Living people
Ukrainian footballers
Ukrainian expatriate footballers
Expatriate footballers in Moldova
FC Metalist Kharkiv players
FC Metalist-2 Kharkiv players
FC Krymteplytsia Molodizhne players
FC Iskra-Stal players
FC Tytan Armyansk players
FC Naftovyk-Ukrnafta Okhtyrka players
Club Green Streets players
FC Inhulets Petrove players
FC Vovchansk players
FC Trostianets players
Ukrainian Premier League players
Ukrainian First League players
Ukrainian Second League players
Ukrainian Amateur Football Championship players
Association football midfielders
Ukrainian expatriate sportspeople in Moldova
Expatriate footballers in the Maldives
Ukrainian expatriate sportspeople in the Maldives
People from Vovchansk
Sportspeople from Kharkiv Oblast